At around 10:30 PM local time on 21 January 2021, a truck carrying sticks of blasting gelatin exploded at a boulder-crushing facility in Abbalagere in Shivamogga district, Karnataka, India. The tremors caused by the explosion were felt in Shivamogga, Chickmagalur and Davanagere districts. Eight people were killed. Eyewitnesses reported broken window panes and cracked roads. The tremors were initially mistaken for an earthquake, but geologists ruled out the possibility.

Narendra Modi, Prime Minister of India, and Rahul Gandhi, the president of the Congress Party, condoled the deaths on Twitter, with Modi stating he was "pained by the loss of lives" and Gandhi calling the incident "tragic". On the same day as the incident, B. S. Yediyurappa, Chief Minister of Karnataka, ordered an investigation into the explosion.

See also
 List of explosions

References

2021 disasters in India
2020s in Karnataka
Explosions in 2021
Industrial fires and explosions in India
January 2021 events in India
Shimoga district